Zhuang script may refer to:
Old Zhuang script
Zhuang alphabet